John D'Silva (born 20 February 1970) is an Indian Konkani actor, playwright and director.
D'Silva is the first tiatrist to enter the Limca Book of Records in 2010 for acting, writing, directing and producing 25 tiatrs having a double alphabet in their titles.

He is the first tiatrist to have released his 25th tiatr Nattok in London and Germany and thereafter to have staged it throughout the state of Goa. He has also acted in the Konkani movies O Maria (2010), Nachom-ia Kumpasar (2015), Nirmon (2015) and O La La (2018). He is the first tiatrist to have received the first Yuva Srujan Puraskar award for Art and Culture in 2009 from the Government of Goa for contributions to Konkani theatre.

References

Living people
Male actors from Goa
Konkani-language singers
Singers from Goa
Tiatrists
1970 births